Taamrat Emmanuel (Circa 1888 - 1963) was a Jewish Ethiopian public figure, professor, rabbi and intellectual. One of the most prominent figures in the Beta Israel community in the Jewish Enlightenment movement and in the Early modern period.

Biography

1888 to 1921 
Taamrat was born on 1888 in the town of Azezo near the city of Gondar. Taamrat's home village became Christian prior to his birth, and therefore he grew up being part of the Falashmura community. In his youth Taamrat attended the School of the Swedish Evangelical Mission in Italian Eritrea. At the age of 16 Taamrat met Dr. Jacques Faitlovitch, who took him back with him to Paris to study. When Taamrat arrived in Paris in 1904, he was sent to a school for teachers of the Alliance israélite universelle organization which was located in Paris. Four years later on, in 1908, when Taamrat was 20 years of age, he was sent by Dr. Faitlovitch to a Jewish Theological Seminary (Collegio Rabbinico Italiano) in Florence, Italy under the watchful eye of Rabbi Dr. Samuel Hirsch Margulies and Rabbi Tzvi-Peretz Hayot. In 1915 Taamrat graduated from the seminary thus becoming a Rabbi, Shochet (Kosher slaughterer) and professor. Emmanuel taught afterwards at the same college for about 16 years and eventually in 1920, at the age of 32, he returned to Ethiopia with Faitlovitch.

1921 to 1936 
After a year and a half in Ethiopia left Taamrat and Faitlovitch left Ethiopia and went to Palestine where they lived between August 1921 until April 1923 until they returned to Ethiopia.  When they returned to Ethiopia Faitlovitch established a Jewish school aimed at training teachers while Taamrat was appointed as the Director of the school. One of his own initiatives included the translation of the Matzhaf Cadoussa (the scriptures of the Beta Israel community) from the Ge'ez language, which had ceased to be the community's spoken language, to the more widely used and common Amharic language. Taamrat became one of the leaders in the Addis Ababa Jewish community which at the time was rapidly increasing due to the Jewish migration to the city from various villages in northern Ethiopia.

Further reading 
 Shalva Weil, "Beta Israel Students Who Studied Abroad 1905-1935" in Svein Ege, Harald Aspen, Birhanu Teferra and Shiferaw Bekele (Editors)  Proceedings of the 16th International Conference of Ethiopian Studies, Norwegian University of Science and Technology, Trondheim, 2009, ISBN, p. 209-217
 Emanuela Trevisan Semi, "Ethiopian Jews in Europe: Taamrat Emmanuel in Italy and Makonnen Levi in England" in Tudor Parfitt and Emanuela Trevisan Semi (Editors) Jews of Ethiopia: The Birth Of An Elite, Routledge, 2005, p. 74-100
 Wolf Leslau, "Taamrat Emmanuel's Notes of Falasha Monks and Holy Places" In Salo Wittmayer Baron Jubilee Volume, American Academy for Jewish Research, Vol. II, 1974, p. 624-367
 Emanuela Trevisan Semi (Editor), L'epistolario di Taamrat Emmanuel, Editrice L'Harmattan Italia, 2000
 Joseph (Giuseppe) Levi, "Taamerat Emmanuel and Giuseppe Levi: A Friendship between an Ethiopian Jewish Maskil and a Fiorentine Jewish Rabbi" in Emanuela Trevisan Semi & Shalva Weil (Editors), Beta Israel: the Jews of Ethiopia and beyond History, Identity and Borders, Libreria Editrice Cafoscarina, 2011, pp. 75–100

References

1888 births
1963 deaths
20th-century translators
Beta Israel
Burials at Har HaMenuchot
Ethiopian academics
Ethiopian rabbis
Ethiopian religious leaders
Ethiopian translators
Faitlovitch students
People from Addis Ababa
People from Azezo
People from Gondar
Year of birth uncertain